Lyman Allen Mills (February 25, 1841 – February 21, 1929) was an American politician who was the 68th Lieutenant Governor of Connecticut from 1899 to 1901.

Mills was born in Middlefield, Connecticut. He studied at the Durham Academy in Connecticut and the North Bridgewater Academy in Massachusetts. Mills was a businessman and cattle breeder. In 1895, He was a member of the Connecticut House of Representatives and served on the Finance Committee. Mills died in Dunedin, Florida.

References

1841 births
1929 deaths
People from Middlefield, Connecticut
Businesspeople from Connecticut
Connecticut politicians
Republican Party members of the Connecticut House of Representatives
Lieutenant Governors of Connecticut